John Crelley (24 September 1881 – 11 October 1946) was an English footballer who played in the Football League for Everton. He played in the 1906 FA Cup Final as Everton beat Newcastle United 1–0.

References 

1881 births
1946 deaths
English footballers
Association football defenders
English Football League players
Millwall F.C. players
Everton F.C. players
Exeter City F.C. players
FA Cup Final players